The Upper Tampa Bay Trail is a  paved multi-use, non-motorized, rail trail located in northwest Hillsborough County, Florida. 

The trail currently starts from just off Memorial Highway and heads north along the Channel A canal. It crosses underneath both a Linebaugh Avenue bridge and CSX Clearwater Subdivision railroad tracks then wraps around the old Northwest Transfer Station landfill. It then follows an abandoned railroad corridor north along the Veterans Expressway. 

The Upper Tampa Bay Trail also has a 4.3 mile section that runs from Van Dyke Road to Lutz Lake Fern Road connecting it to the Suncoast Trail.

Trailheads 
 Peterson Road Park
 Ehrlich Road
 Wilsky
 Channel Park
 Old Memorial
Lutz Lake Fern Road

References

External links
Historic Tampa Bay Gulf Coast Rail Trestle Bridge (Google Street View Images)
 Upper Tampa Bay Trail at 100 Florida Trails 

Transportation in Hillsborough County, Florida
Rail trails in Florida
Parks in Hillsborough County, Florida
Bike paths in Florida